Tomasz Artur Makowski (born 1970) – Director General of the National Library of Poland, head of the National Council for Libraries, head of the National Reserve of Library Collections Committee and head of the Digitization Committee at the Ministry of Culture and National Heritage.

Biography
Makowski has worked in the National Library since 1994. Before becoming Director General in 2007, he was Deputy Director General and Director for Research, as well as Head of Special Collections.

He is a board member of a large number of organizations and institutions in Poland and abroad, including The European Library, UNESCO Memory of the World National Committee, the Archives Board under General Director of State Archives, the Book Institute Programme Board, The Fryderyk Chopin Institute Programme Board, “Polish Libraries Today” Editorial Committee, the National Museum in Kraków Board, the Museum of Literature Board and the Łazienki Królewskie Museum Board. In 2005 he was the curator of the first monographic exhibition about the Zamoyski Library (2005). He is assistant professor at Cardinal Stefan Wyszyński University in Warsaw.

Author of three books (1996, 1998, 2005) and a number of articles, he specializes in the history of libraries and manuscript studies.

References

External links 

 Tomasz Makowski bio on The Fryderyk Chopin Institute webpage
 Biogram na stronie Instytutu Nauk Historycznych (Polish)

1970 births
Living people
Polish librarians
Cardinal Stefan Wyszyński University in Warsaw alumni
Academic staff of Cardinal Stefan Wyszyński University in Warsaw